Distocambarus devexus, the Broad River burrowing crayfish, is a species of crayfish in the family Cambaridae. It is endemic to Georgia. The common name refers to the Broad River.

References

Further reading

 
 

Cambaridae
Articles created by Qbugbot
Freshwater crustaceans of North America
Endemic fauna of Georgia (U.S. state)
Crustaceans described in 1981
Taxa named by Horton H. Hobbs Jr.